Route 141 is a north/south highway in Quebec on the south shore of the Saint Lawrence River. Its northern terminus is in Magog at the junction of Route 112 and Autoroute 10, and the southern terminus is in Saint-Herménégilde at the United States border in Canaan, Vermont.

Municipalities along Route 141
 Saint-Herménégilde
 Dixville
 Coaticook
 Barnston-Ouest
 Stanstead-Est
 Ayer's Cliff
 Sainte-Catherine-de-Hatley
 Magog
 Orford

Major intersections

See also
 List of Quebec provincial highways

References

External links 
 Provincial Route Map (Courtesy of the Quebec Ministry of Transportation) 
 Route 141 on Google Maps

141
Transport in Magog, Quebec